The Fred Waring Show is an American television musical variety show that ran from April 17, 1949 to May 30, 1954 on CBS. The show was hosted by Fred Waring and featured his choral group "The Pennsylvanians".

Synopsis
Sponsored by General Electric, the series aired every Sunday night at 9 p.m. after The Ed Sullivan Show, excluding the summer months. It was initially 60 minutes in length, but its time slot was cut to 30 minutes beginning in January 1952. During the 1954 season, the show alternated on Sunday nights with General Electric Theater. Focusing on currently popular music and standard tunes, the show included performances by his orchestra and large chorus, as well as dancing and sketches.

The show's theme was "Sleep", which was composed by Earl Burtnett and Adam Geibel. Bob Banner was the producer and director.

In 1957, The Fred Waring Show made a brief return to television as a summer replacement daytime series in the time slot usually occupied by The Garry Moore Show. This version originated from a resort operated by Waring at Shawnee on Delaware, Pennsylvania.

A review of the program in the trade publication Broadcasting described the program as featuring "friendly banter with his crew, plus renditions of old-time favorite songs and ballads by the chorus and vocalists."

Conflict over control
Producing the early Waring show caused conflicts between Waring and network officials over whether he should adapt performances to fit the new medium or whether TV should adapt its procedures to accommodate Waring's group's performances. Murray Forman wrote in his book, One Night on TV Is Worth Weeks at the Paramount: Popular Music on Early Television, "Fred Waring wrestled with CBS executives for direct input in the production and performances on his program ... seeking to assert greater autonomy and control over the show's musical performances."

References

External links

1949 American television series debuts
1954 American television series endings
1940s American variety television series
1950s American variety television series
Black-and-white American television shows
CBS original programming
English-language television shows
General Electric sponsorships